Danièle Girard is the name of
 Gabrielle Danièle Marguerite Andrée Girard (1926–2015), a French actress better known by her stage name Danièle Delorme
 Danièle Girard, an actress known from Bande à part